Harry Primrose may refer to:
 Harry Primrose, 6th Earl of Rosebery, British politician
 Harry Primrose, Lord Dalmeny, British aristocrat and chairman of Sotheby's